Michael Fanone (born September 3, 1980) is an American law enforcement analyst and former police officer, who is currently a CNN on-air contributor. He worked for the Metropolitan Police Department of the District of Columbia from 2001 to 2021.

Early life 
Fanone was born on September 3, 1980, and raised in Alexandria, Virginia. His mother, Terry Fanone, is a social worker and his father is a lawyer at a large law firm. They divorced when he was eight years old. His mother came from a working-class family in rural Maryland. Fanone attended St. Mary's Elementary School, and Georgetown Preparatory School for a year. He then attended boarding school in Maine. He left to work in construction and graduated from Ballou High School. He later joined the Metropolitan Police Department of the District of Columbia in Washington, D.C..

Career 
Fanone joined the United States Capitol Police during the aftermath of the September 11 attacks. A few years later, he joined the Metropolitan Police Department of the District of Columbia, remaining a member for approximately 20 years.

During the January6, 2021 attack on the Capitol, Fanone was assaulted by rioters—dragged down the Capitol steps, beaten with pipes, stunned with a Taser, and threatened with his own gun. Fanone suffered burns, a heart attack, and traumatic brain injuries as a result. Fanone testified before the United States House Select Committee on the January 6 Attack. In June 2021, Fanone asked Kevin McCarthy and other Republicans in Congress to denounce the January 6 conspiracies. Due to physical and emotional injuries, he returned to limited duty in September 2021, working in the technical and analytical services bureau. In October 2021, one of the men charged with assaulting Fanone was released from jail and put under house arrest. After submitting his resignation, Fanone's last day on duty was December 31, 2021.

Fanone joined CNN in January 2022 as an on-air contributor and law enforcement analyst.

Ahead of the second anniversary of the January 6 United States Capitol attack, Fanone wrote a letter, signed by more than 1,000 veterans, law enforcement, active military members and family, calling on Republican leadership in the United States House of Representatives to denounce political violence. The letter was hand delivered by military veterans to top Republican leaders, and Fanone delivered a copy of the letter to the office of Rep. Marjorie Taylor Greene. Fanone and dozens of military veterans, including House members Reps. Jason Crow, Chrissy Houlahan, Mikie Sherrill, and Chris Deluzio, also spoke at a rally in front of the United States Capitol, which was organized by the groups Courage for America and Common Defense.

On January 6, 2023, Fanone was awarded the Presidential Citizens Medal by President Joe Biden.

Personal life 

Fanone is divorced and has four daughters. While he remained estranged from his ex-wife until the January 6th attack, after the attack he described her as "a pretty integral part of [his] support system".

He lives in Virginia with his mother. Fanone was formerly a supporter of Donald Trump and voted for him in the 2016 United States presidential election, but stopped supporting him after his dismissal of James Comey and after comments he made that he perceived to be anti-Asian.

Bibliography

References

External links

CNN people
Living people
Metropolitan Police Department of the District of Columbia officers
People from Alexandria, Virginia
United States Capitol Police officers
Defending officers during the January 6 United States Capitol attack
1980 births
Presidential Citizens Medal recipients